Evheniya Tulchevska (born 1990 in Dnipropetrovsk, Ukrainian SSR) is a Ukrainian model who represented her country in the Miss World 2009 pageant, which took place on December 12, 2009, in Johannesburg, South Africa.

At the time of becoming Miss Ukraine 2009, she was a  student of the National Mining University of Ukraine.

External links
 Details of the contest Miss Ukraine with many photos 
 Model photos with other details 
 "Міс Україна 2009" розповіла про свого крутого бойфренда, Табло ID (September 8, 2009) 
 Short personal details 

1990 births
Living people
Miss World 2009 delegates
Ukrainian female models
Ukrainian beauty pageant winners
Dnipro Polytechnic alumni